Facciolella saurencheloides is an eel in the family Nettastomatidae (duckbill/witch eels). It was described by Umberto D'Ancona in 1928. It is a marine, deep water-dwelling eel which is known from the northwestern and western Indian Ocean, including the Red Sea. It dwells at a depth range of 700–2000 metres.

References

Nettastomatidae
Fish described in 1928